An Emergency Response Unit is a name for a law enforcement or other civil government entity that is trained and equipped to respond quickly to emergency situations. In some instances, such a designation is given to a Special Weapons and Tactics unit, although it can also be used for units intended to respond to natural disasters and other situations not requiring the use of weaponry.

Examples include:
Garda Emergency Response Unit, a specialist armed tactical intervention team of Ireland's police
Emergency Response Unit (IFRC), pre-trained teams of specialist volunteers of the International Federation of Red Cross and Red Crescent Societies
Emergency Response Unit (Cyprus), a division within the Cyprus police
Emergency Response Division, a counter-terrorism unit of the Iraqi Interior Ministry.
Emergency Response Unit (Liberia)
Counter Terrorism Centre (Hungary)
Law enforcement units

fr:Emergency Response Unit